In Greek mythology, the name Hippocoön (Hippokóōn) refers to several characters: 
Hippocoon, in one account, father of Neleus, who is otherwise called son of Cretheus or Poseidon.
Hippocoon, a Spartan king, father of Enarephoros and brother of Tyndareus from whom Hippocoon seized the kingship, then exiled Tyndareus.
Hippocoon, the great-grandfather of Amphiaraus. The lineage is as follows: Zeuxippe, daughter of this Hippocoön, married Antiphates and gave birth to Oecles and Amphalces; Oecles, in his turn, married Hypermnestra, daughter of Thespius, and to them were born Iphianeira, Polyboea and Amphiaraus.
Hippocoon, a Thracian counsellor and a kinsman of Rhesus, who fought at Troy. Awakened by Apollo, he is the first to discover the damage caused by Odysseus and Diomedes in the Thracian camp.
Hippocoon, in the Aeneid, son of Hyrtacus, one of the participants in the archery contest at Anchises's funeral games. His arrow misses, striking the mast to which the target dove is tied.

Notes

References 

 Apollodorus, The Library with an English Translation by Sir James George Frazer, F.B.A., F.R.S. in 2 Volumes, Cambridge, MA, Harvard University Press; London, William Heinemann Ltd. 1921. ISBN 0-674-99135-4. Online version at the Perseus Digital Library. Greek text available from the same website.
Diodorus Siculus, The Library of History translated by Charles Henry Oldfather. Twelve volumes. Loeb Classical Library. Cambridge, Massachusetts: Harvard University Press; London: William Heinemann, Ltd. 1989. Vol. 3. Books 4.59–8. Online version at Bill Thayer's Web Site
 Diodorus Siculus, Bibliotheca Historica. Vol 1-2. Immanel Bekker. Ludwig Dindorf. Friedrich Vogel. in aedibus B. G. Teubneri. Leipzig. 1888–1890. Greek text available at the Perseus Digital Library.
 Homer, The Iliad with an English Translation by A.T. Murray, Ph.D. in two volumes. Cambridge, MA., Harvard University Press; London, William Heinemann, Ltd. 1924. . Online version at the Perseus Digital Library.
Homer, Homeri Opera in five volumes. Oxford, Oxford University Press. 1920. . Greek text available at the Perseus Digital Library.
 Publius Vergilius Maro, Aeneid. Theodore C. Williams. trans. Boston. Houghton Mifflin Co. 1910. Online version at the Perseus Digital Library.
 Publius Vergilius Maro, Bucolics, Aeneid, and Georgics. J. B. Greenough. Boston. Ginn & Co. 1900. Latin text available at the Perseus Digital Library.

Characters in the Aeneid
Characters in Greek mythology

sk:Hippokóon